"Crazy for You" is a song recorded by Canadian pop rock band Hedley for their fifth studio album, Wild Life (2013). It was made available for purchase on iTunes on October 22, 2013 as a promotional single supporting pre-orders of the album. The song was released as the second official single off the album on January 20, 2014 through Universal Music Canada. It was a success in Canada, reaching the top 10 and selling over 166,000 copies. In the US, "Crazy for You" was served to hot adult contemporary radio through Capitol Records on March 17, 2014.

Music video
The official music video for "Crazy for You" was directed by J. Lee Williams and Timur Musabay, and premiered on February 14, 2014. In the clip, the band members are locked in a psychiatric hospital, from which they escape and subsequently go on the run, whereupon they discover that the world outside is different than they remember. The video was nominated for the Post-Production Video of the Year at the 2014 MMVAs, but it lost to City and Colour's "Thirst".

Awards and nominations

Track listing
UK CD single
 "Crazy for You (Radio edit)" – 3:21
 "Radio ID" – 0:04
 "Song Intro" – 0:10

Charts

Weekly charts

Year-end charts

Certifications

Release history

References

2013 songs
2014 singles
Hedley (band) songs
Universal Music Group singles
Capitol Records singles
Songs written by Brian Howes
Songs written by Jacob Hoggard